Redcliff is a parliamentary constituency in the National Assembly of the Parliament of Zimbabwe created out of Kwekwe constituency prior to the 2008 general election. It comprises Redcliff town, Ripple Creek and Komera. It also covers parts of Silobela such as St Marks, Totololo, Loreto, Gothic Mine and Hozoli. East of the Harare-Bulawayo Road it takes up to Shungu and Mlezu in Chiwundura. It is administered by Redcliff Municipality. However, five of its wards are under Zibagwe Rural District Council: 22, 23, 24 and 30, and parts of ward 3.

Current MP

The current Member of Parliament for Redcliff is Hon. Lloyd Dzikamai Mukapiko.

Local authorities

Local government comprises nine urban councillors under Redcliff Municipality and four rural district councillors under Kwekwe Rural District Council, officially called Zibagwe Rural District Council.

Population

Population table

Voters here were almost 50% of the population which suggests that almost every adult is a registered voter and each couple have two children under majority age. This raises questions as to whether the census can be relied upon.

Voters

Education

There are 29 primary schools and 4 secondary schools in Redcliff Constituency, 119 primary school teachers and 70 at secondary schools. Enrolment according to a 2011 government publication was 17,002 primary school pupils and 688 secondary school students.

Primary schools

Secondary schools

All four secondary schools in Redcliff Constituency are owned by the Kwekwe Rural District Council officially called Zibagwe RDC.  Enrolment total in the four schools was 688 students to 70 teachers, for a 10:1 ratio.

Ward 22 has the highest number of students, Ward 24 the least, while Ward 25 has the highest number of female students.

Health facilities

Source: Redcliff Constituency Profile

Key: Rural HC = Rural health center. This a clinic, less than a hospital.

Animal health

There are 17,442 cattle, 8 veterinary service centers and 18 dip tanks. Ward 25 has highest number of cattle and Ward 30 the least. Cattle and dip tanks are in wards 1, 22, 24, 25 and 30 only.

Distribution table

Water points

These exclude urban area water points.

 Ward 22 = Makaba Ward 
 Ward 24 = Kushinga Ward 
 Ward 25 = Msokeli Ward

2018 parliamentary election

2013 parliamentary election

2008 parliamentary election

Six candidates contested for the Redcliff Constituency parliamentary seat with the final result coming after a by-election on 27 June 2008. 
Isheunesu Muza of ZANU-PF beat Chinhara Aaron of MDC-M, Tapera Sengweni of MDC-T, Makaha Ignatius of ZDP and Anastasia Moyo, an Independent candidate.

See also

List of Zimbabwean parliamentary constituencies

References

Parliamentary constituencies in Zimbabwe